Shenzhen Media Group is a media company based in Shenzhen, Guangdong province, China. It owns twelve TV channels and four radio stations which broadcast Chinese music, report news and Chinese talk shows.

Channels and stations

Television channels
As of 2016, The list of all channels and radio stations of Shenzhen Media Group are as follows:

SZTV International Available On:The List in Asia; Cable TV Hong Kong Channel 26 and now TV Channel 540

Radio stations

South African holdings
In May 2009 South African fixed-line telephone operator Telkom said it had sold its majority stake in start-up broadcaster Telkom Media to the Shenzhen Group. The parties had been in negotiations since at least March 2008.

External links
Official Website

References

Chinese-language radio stations
Mandarin-language radio stations
Radio stations in China
Mass media in Shenzhen
Television channels and stations established in 2004